Once Upon a Time Twenty Years Later is a 1980 Soviet comedy film directed by Yuri Yegorov.

Plot 
The film tells about the graduates of a Moscow school who come together 20 years later and try to answer two questions: What have you already done? and What else are you waiting for in life? Those are not easy to answer for Natalia, a mother of ten.

Cast 
 Natalya Gundareva as Nadya Kruglova
 Viktor Proskurin as Kirill
 Yevgeni Lazarev
 Oleg Efremov as Painter
 Valentina Titova
 Olga Gobzeva		
 Aleksandr Potapov
 Igor Yasulovich
 Valentin Smirnitskiy
 Alyona Chukhray

References

External links 
 

1980 films
1980s Russian-language films
Soviet comedy films
1980 comedy films